Power Struggle is an annual professional wrestling event promoted by New Japan Pro-Wrestling (NJPW). The event has been held since 2011 and aired domestically as a pay-per-view (PPV). From 2012 to 2014, the event also aired outside Japan as an internet pay-per-view (iPPV). Since 2015, the event has aired worldwide on NJPW's internet streaming site, NJPW World. The event is held in November and is the final major event before the annual January 4 Dome Show, NJPW's biggest event of the year.

Events

See also

List of New Japan Pro-Wrestling pay-per-view events

References

External links
The official New Japan Pro-Wrestling website
Power Struggle at ProWrestlingHistory.com